Elaphrus finitimus is a species of ground beetle in the subfamily Elaphrinae. It was described by Casey in 1920.

References

Elaphrinae
Beetles described in 1920